Gerhard Anton Eickhoff (September 11, 1827 – November 5, 1901) was a German-American journalist, editor, author, lawyer, Congressman from New York, United States Treasury auditor, and New York City Fire Commissioner.

Biography
He was born in the rural hamlet Kaldewei, part of the village of Benninghausen, Prussia, today suburbanized into Lippstadt, Northrhine, Westphalia, Germany. His parents Caspar Eickhoff (1803–1867) and Maria Catharina Trockel (1803–1863) and their forefathers were peasants in the hamlet Kaldewei, born in serfdom to the Cistercian Cloister of Benninghausen (founded in 1240, secularized in 1804), but ultimately released from serfdom by the Grand Duke in 1809.

After his school education he started to work as a teacher in Lippstadt and publicized radical writings in pre-revolutionary Prussia until 1847. In 1847 he decided to emigrate to the United States and boarded the ship Itzstein & Welcker sailing from Bremen on October 24, 1847, and arrived in New Orleans on January 6, 1848.

He married Louise Elisa Neuenschwander around 1855. She immigrated from Switzerland to the United States. Their children were Henry Eickhoff (January 17, 1856 – October 17, 1933) and two daughters. Anthony Eickhoff's grandson was lawyer Henry Eickhoff, Jr. (February 17, 1898 – August 12, 1954).

First profession and journalism (1848–1856)
His first employment was as deckhand on a Mississippi steamboat, later he became a teacher in a Jesuit school in St. Louis and studied law. Early he began to work as journalist, founder and editor of several German newspapers. In St. Louis, Missouri, he was founder and editor of St. Louis Zeitung in 1848 and 1849. In Dubuque, Iowa, he edited Der Nordwestliche Demokrat, later named Iowa Staatszeitung, from 1849 to 1850. In Louisville, Kentucky, it was Der Beobachter am Ohio, edited 1850–1852. Finally he settled in New York City: he edited Die Abendpost in 1852 and New Yorker Staats-Zeitung from 1854 to 1856. He became naturalized in 1855 and practiced law.

Serving New York State, Congress and Treasury Department (1863–1889)
During the civil war he served as Commissary General of Subsistence for the State of New York troops, appointed in 1863. In 1864 he was elected to the New York State Legislature. In 1876 he was elected as Democrat to the 45th Congress as a representative of the 7th district of New York (March 4, 1877 – March 3, 1879), but was an unsuccessful candidate in re-election to the 46th Congress in 1878. Later he was Fifth Auditor in the United States Treasury Department from August 1, 1885, to May 17, 1889.

Serving as New York City municipality official 1889–1901
In 1874 he was elected Coroner of New York City until 1876. He became the Fire Commissioner of New York City  in 1889, re-appointed until 1896 and served as an Auditor of the New York City Fire Department from 1898 until his death in 1901.

He died on November 5, 1901, in New York City and is buried in Green-Wood Cemetery.

Works
In der Neuen Heimath: geschichtliche Mittheilungen über die deutschen Einwanderer in allen Theilen der Union; Steiger & Co., New York City 1st edition 1884, 2nd edition 1885; German
Mexico. Aus einer Discussion in einem deutschen demokratischen Vereine zu New York; 1865, New York City Library; German

References

External links

1827 births
1901 deaths
People from Lippstadt
German emigrants to the United States
Burials at Green-Wood Cemetery
Coroners of New York County, New York
Democratic Party members of the United States House of Representatives from New York (state)
19th-century American politicians